The Red Deer Canadian Pacific Railway Bridge is a former Canadian Pacific Railway bridge turned pedestrian bridge in the City of Red Deer, located in Central Alberta, Canada. The bridge carries cyclists and pedestrians on the Trans Canada Trail over the Red Deer River, another part of the Trans Canada Trail, and a decommissioned street.

History
The bridge was originally constructed during the winter of 1890-91 as a sturdy 3-span timber truss railway bridge near the Leonard Gaetz homestead by the Canadian Pacific Railway for the Calgary and Edmonton Railway. It served as a traffic and rail bridge. The original spans over the river were eventually replaced by the current two 150 ft. span  steel truss through system in 1907 at the cost of an estimated C$57,000. Earth and concrete replaced some other parts of the original trestle. In July 1908, bridge labourer James J. Shea died  of complications after falling into the river below.

In 1991, the bridge, and a nearby train station, were abandoned after the rail yards were relocated to the west side of the city and a new bridge was constructed. On September 3, 1991, Red Deer City Council passed a by-law designating the rail bridge as a Municipal Historic Resource and in 1993, the bridge was designated a Provincial Historic site. On Sept. 13, 1992, the bridge was officially reopened at the cost of C$171,500.

See also
List of crossings of the Red Deer River
List of bridges in Canada

References

Buildings and structures in Red Deer, Alberta
Pedestrian bridges in Canada
Railway bridges in Alberta
Road bridges in Alberta